Chalu may refer to:

Record of Tea, a Chinese tea classic by Cai Xiang

Places in China
 Chalu, Anhui, in Huoqiu County, Anhui
 Chalu, Zhejiang, in Ninghai County, Zhejiang

Places in Iran
 Chalu, Kerman
 Chalu, Behshahr, Mazandaran Province
 Chalu, Sari, Mazandaran Province
 Chalu, Tonekabon, Mazandaran Province
 Chalu, North Khorasan
 Chalu District, in Khuzestan Province
 Chalu Rural District, in Khuzestan Province

See also
 Chalow (disambiguation)